The 2006 Georgetown Hoyas football team was an American football team that represented Georgetown University during the 2006 NCAA Division I FCS football season. Georgetown finished last in the Patriot League.

In their first year under head coach Kevin Kelly, the Hoyas compiled a 2–9 record. Alex Buzbee and Liam Grubb were the team captains.

The Hoyas were outscored 287 to 164. Their winless (0–6) conference record was the worst in the seven-team Patriot League standings. 

Georgetown played its home games at Multi-Sport Field on the university campus in Washington, D.C.

Schedule

References

Georgetown
Georgetown Hoyas football seasons
Georgetown Hoyas football